Sołtysy may refer to the following places:
Sołtysy, Lublin Voivodeship (east Poland)
Sołtysy, Masovian Voivodeship (east-central Poland)
Sołtysy, Opole Voivodeship (south-west Poland)